Haplogroup Q-L804 (Y-DNA) is a Y-chromosome DNA haplogroup. Haplogroup Q-L804 is a subclade of Haplogroup Q-L54.  Currently  Q-L804 is 
Q1b1a1b below Q1b-M346.

In 2000 the research group at Oxford University headed by Dr. Agnar Helgason first discovered the haplotype that was much later to become known as Q-L804. In 2000 the strange haplotype was called “branch-A” (i.e. R1b-branch A) and it was found uniquely on Iceland and Scandinavia. Later studies completed the genetic bridge by determining that Q-L804 is related to Q-M242 populations of Native Americans, Turkmen (Q-M3) and Siberian populations of the Selkup and Ket people (Q-L54*xM3).

Origin and distribution
The origin of Haplogroup Q-L804 is uncertain. However it is likely to have originated in Beringia (North East Siberia) c. 15000 to 17000 yBP since it is closely linked to Q-M3 and to other haplogroups linked to the indigenous peoples of the Americas (over 90% of indigenous people in Meso & South America). Today, Q-L804 is found mainly in Norway and Sweden and in regions of North West Europe of Viking Age Expansion (British Isles, Atlantic Isles, Northern Germany, Normandy and Poland). The Q-L804 is also found among descendants of Scandinavian immigrants to North America. Q-L804 occurred on the Q-L54 lineage roughly 10-15 thousand years ago as the migration into the Americas was underway. It is likely that the split between Q-M3 and Q-L804 happened in the ancestors of the indigenous peoples of the Americas.

North Europe
Populations carrying Q-L804 are extremely thinly distributed throughout Northern Europe and among recent North European immigrants to North America. Since the discovery and definition of Q-L804 in 2014, three main subclades of Q-L804 bearing populations have been discovered in North Europe. The Q-Y9052 , the Q-JN14 and Q-Y7582. Of these three branches Q-JN14 has the widest distribution, ranging from Poland to Iceland, British Isles and France. Q-L804 is one of two subclades known as Q Nordic among genealogical communities. The Q-L527 is the other subclad of the Q Nordic.

Subclade distribution
Q-Y9052 (BY459). This lineage is found in Sweden, Norway and Germany.

Q-JN14 It has been found in Norway, Iceland, British Isles, Germany, France and Poland.

Q-Y7582 (BY386). This lineage has been found in Scotland, Iceland and England.

Technical specification of mutation
The L804 was discovered and defined by Thomas Krahn of Family Tree DNA's Genomics Research Center in 2012.
The technical details of L804 are:

Nucleotide change: T to A
Position (base pair): 
Total size (base pairs): 
Forward 5′→ 3′: 
Reverse 5′→ 3′: 
Position:  chrY:11,907,522
dbSNP151: rs765685783

Associated SNPs 
Q-L804 is defined by the SNPs L804 and L805 and E324.

Phylogentic tree and Subgroups 

Current status of the polygenetic tree for Q-L804 is published by Pinotti et al. in the article Y Chromosome Sequences Reveal a Short Beringian Standstill, Rapid Expansion, and early Population structure of Native American Founders. Calibrated phylogeny of Y haplogroup Q-L804 and its relation to the other branches of Q-L54.  
 Q-L54
 Q-L330 
 Q-MPB001 (18.9 kya)
 Q-CTS1780 
 Q-M930 
 Q-L804
 Q-M3 (15.0 kya) 
 Q-Y4308
 Q-M848 (14.9 kya)

Yfull's tree also include estimation of the age of the branches, and TMRCA (Time to Most Recent Common Ancestor)

 Q > Q-L472 > Q-L56 > Q-L53 > Q-L54 > Q-M1107 > Q-M930 
 Q-L804 formed 15200 ybp, TMRCA 3200 yBP
 Q-Y9052 formed 3200 ybp, TMRCA 3200 yBP 
 Q-Y9294 formed 3200 ybp, TMRCA 2800 ybp
 Q-YP5210
 Q-Y9048
 Q-A13540 formed 3200 ybp, TMRCA 2900 yBP
 Q-JN15 formed 2900 ybp, TMRCA 1650 yBP
 Q-Y16137 
 Q-Y7582 formed 2900 ybp, TMRCA 1650 yBP
 Q-Y38488
 Q-Y12445
 Q-Y15622

Family Tree DNA Y-DNA haplotree for haplogroup Q-L804  

 Q (M242) > Q-MEH2 > Q-M346 > Q-L53 > Q-L54  > Q-CTS3814 > Q-CTS11969
 Q-L804
 Q-BY387
 Q-PH2487
 Q-Y38488
 Q-JN14
 Q-Y16137
 Q-BY66620
 Q-BY459 
 Q-Y9291

The subtree Q-BY387 is found on Iceland, Scotland and England. The Q-JN14 is widely distributed in North-west Europe, but most kits are from Norway. The subtree Q-BY459 is by FT DNA mainly found in Sweden and Norway.

See also
Human Y-chromosome DNA haplogroup

Y-DNA Q-M242 subclades

Y-DNA backbone tree

References

External links 
The Y-DNA Haplogroup Q-L804 Q Nordic  Project
Y-DNA Haplogroup Q and its Subclades - 2019

Q-L804